George Kirstein (December 10, 1909 – April 3, 1986) was publisher and principal owner of The Nation magazine from 1955 to 1965.

Background
George G. Kirstein was born on December 10, 1909, Boston.  He attended the Berkshire School, a private boarding school in Sheffield, Massachusetts and graduated in 1929.  He attended Harvard College and graduated in 1933.

Career
After Harvard, Kirstein went to Hollywood, where he worked as an assistant director at RKO.  He then worked at Bloomingdale's from 1938 to 1941.

During World War II, he served as executive secretary of the National Defense Mediation Board and the National War Labor Board.  He also served as a lieutenant in the U.S. Navy, stationed in the South Pacific from 1943 to 1945.  He worked five years as a management labor-consultant, then became executive vice president of the Health Insurance Plan of Greater New York from 1950 to 1955.

He then bought and published The Nation from 1955 to 1965.  In its obituary, the New York Times wrote that he was “instrumental in preserving The Nation's liberal independent voice.”  The magazine became solvent under his guidance and won many awards.

He headed the Mamaroneck Historical Society from 1965 until his retirement in 1971.  He was a trustee of Montefiore Medical Center in the Bronx.  He was also a member of the New York Foundation.

Personal
Kirstein was married to Elinor Ferry, a member of the Independent-Socialist Party and lifelong support of Alger Hiss.

He sailed often with friend Robert Penn Warren.

Death
Kirstein died from a heart attack at his home in Mamaroneck, New York, aged 76.

Works
 The Rich:  Are They Different? (1968) 
 "Better Giving" (1975)
 "Learning to Sail the Hard Way" (1979)

References

1909 births
1986 deaths
Businesspeople from Boston
American magazine publishers (people)
United States Navy personnel of World War II
Harvard College alumni
20th-century American writers
20th-century American businesspeople
20th-century American male writers
United States Navy officers